Lijndenia capitellata is a species of plant in the family Melastomataceae. It is endemic to Sri Lanka. Locally, the plant is known as "pini baru - පිනි බරු" in Sinhala.

References

capitellata
Endemic flora of Sri Lanka